10cc is the debut album by the British rock band 10cc, first released in 1973. It was recorded at Strawberry Studios in Stockport, which was part-owned by guitarist and engineer Eric Stewart, and released on Jonathan King's UK Records label. The album reached number 36 in the UK Albums Chart.

Release and promotion 
Three of its four UK singles reached the Top 10 in the charts, including the Number One hit "Rubber Bullets", which also topped the chart in Australia. The fifth single "Headline Hustler" was released only in the American market to promote a tour in the USA.

The closing track, "Fresh Air for My Mama", was a reworking of "You Didn't Like It Because You Didn't Think of It", the B-side of 1970's "Neanderthal Man", an international hit by the band under its former name of Hotlegs.

Some versions of the album have an altered running order.

The 2000 CD reissue of the album featured all the b-sides of the album's singles. The album in its entirety along with 2000's bonus cuts appeared, along with 10cc's second album, "Sheet Music" and all its released bonus cuts, on 2004 10cc – The Complete UK Recordings, on Varèse Sarabande Records.

Critical reception 
Reviewing in Christgau's Record Guide: Rock Albums of the Seventies (1981), Robert Christgau wrote: "If you only know the forty-five-rpm version of 'Rubber Bullets,' then you missed their best rhyme: 'balls and chains' with 'balls and brains.' A calculated, devilishly clever version of what the Beach Boys ought to be doing. Or the Bonzo Dog Band should have done. Or something."

Record World said of "Headline Hustler" that "'Paperback Writer' goes the daily route. Englishmen take on Beatles-ish overtones to rock out their saga of a budding Jack Anderson."

Track listing

German 1993 CD re-release bonus track

2000 Repertoire CD reissue bonus tracks

Personnel 
10cc
 Eric Stewart – lead electric guitar, slide guitar, Moog synthesizer, vocals
 Lol Creme – acoustic guitar, electric guitar, grand piano, synthesizer, Mellotron, percussion, vocals
 Graham Gouldman – bass, acoustic guitar, Dobro guitar, electric guitar, tambourine, vocals
 Kevin Godley – drums, percussion, vocals

Charts

Weekly charts

Certifications

References 

10cc albums
1973 debut albums
UK Records albums
Mercury Records albums
Repertoire Records albums
Albums recorded at Strawberry Studios